Missing, Believed Married is a 1937 British comedy film directed by John Paddy Carstairs and starring Wally Patch, Julian Vedey and Hazel Terry. It was a quota quickie made at Pinewood Studios. A young heiress is almost tricked into marriage by a fortune hunter.

The film's sets were designed by Wilfred Arnold.

Plot
When young Heiress Hermione Blakiston discovers that the count she was engaged to is a fortune-hunting imposter, she runs away. Concussion to the head during a street brawl leaves Hermione with amnesia, but she is rescued and taken in by street vendors Flatiron and Mario. When the count appears on the scene once more and tricks Hermione into going to Paris with him, her new friends follow and rescue her again.

Cast
 Wally Patch as Flatiron Stubbs  
 Julian Vedey as Mario Moroni  
 Hazel Terry as Hermione Blakiston  
 Emilio Cargher as Emilio Graffia  
 Peter Coke as Peter  
 Margaret Rutherford as Lady Parke  
 Charles Paton as Mr. Horton  
 Irene Handl as Chambermaid

References

Bibliography
 Low, Rachael. Filmmaking in 1930s Britain. George Allen & Unwin, 1985.
 Wood, Linda. British Films, 1927-1939. British Film Institute, 1986.

External links

1937 films
1937 comedy films
British comedy films
British and Dominions Studios films
Films directed by John Paddy Carstairs
Films set in England
Films shot at Pinewood Studios
Quota quickies
British black-and-white films
1930s English-language films
1930s British films